Nyree Der-Megerdichian (born 27 September 2001) is an American-raised Armenian footballer who plays as a midfielder for the Armenia women's national team.

Early life
Der-Megerdichian was raised in Los Angeles, California.

International career
Der-Megerdichian capped for Armenia at senior level in a 0–1 friendly loss to Lithuania on 4 March 2020.

See also
List of Armenia women's international footballers

References

2001 births
Living people
Women's association football midfielders
Armenian women's footballers
Armenia women's international footballers
American women's soccer players
Soccer players from Los Angeles
American people of Armenian descent
21st-century American women